This is a list of Spanish football transfers for the 2007–08 La Liga season. Transfers are only allowed in limited transfer windows in summer and winter.

Winter window
The 2008 winter window opened 31 December and closed 31 January.

Almería
In:
 Guilherme – From Vasco Da Gama
 Iriney – From Celta de Vigo
 Veljko Paunović – From Rubin Kazan

Out:
 Natalio – On loan to Cádiz
 Mathias Vidangossy – On loan to Unión Española

Athletic Bilbao
In:
 Armando – From Cádiz CF

Out:
 Ion Vélez – On Loan to Hércules

Atlético Madrid
In:

Out:
 Maniche – On Loan to Inter Milan

Barcelona
In:
 José Manuel Pinto – On Loan from Celta de Vigo
Thierry Henry-from Arsenal
Out:
 Marc Crosas – On Loan to Olympique Lyonnais

Betis
In:

Out:

Deportivo
In:
 Christian Wilhelmsson – On Loan from FC Nantes

Out:
 Pablo Álvarez Núñez – On Loan to Racing de Santander
 Aythami Artiles Oliva – On Loan to Xerez CD

Espanyol
In:
 Ewerthon – On Loan from Real Zaragoza

Out:

Getafe
In:
 Jaime Gavilán – From Valencia

Out:
 Alberto – To Granada 74
 Luis García – On Loan to Celta de Vigo

Levante
In:
 Albert Meyong – Return From Albacete Balompié

Out:
 Sávio – Released
 Marco Storari – Return To A.C. Milan (end of loan)
 Bruno Cirillo – On Loan to Reggina
 Albert Meyong – On Loan to C.F. Os Belenenses

Mallorca
In:
 Lionel Scaloni – From Lazio

Out:
 Guillermo Pereyra – to Lokomotiv Moscow

Murcia
In:
 Rosinei – From Corinthians
 Abderrahman Kabous – From CSKA Sofia

Out:

Osasuna
In:
 Martín Astudillo – On Loan from CD Alavés

Out:

Racing
In:
 Damián Ismodes – From Sporting Cristal
 Sergio Orteman – From Istanbul B.B.
 Pablo Álvarez Núñez – On Loan from Deportivo la Coruña

Out:

Real Madrid

In: 
 Daniel Opare – From Ashanti Gold SC (£2 m) (Will begin playing next season)

Out:

Recreativo
In:
 Marco Rubén – On Loan from Villarreal CF

Out:

Sevilla
In:

Out:
 Andreas Hinkel – To Celtic (€2,6m)
 Aleksandr Kerzhakov – To Dynamo Moscow (£5m)
 Ariza Makukula – To Benfica (£2m)
 Jesuli – Loan to Tenerife
 José Luis Martí – Loan to Real Sociedad

Valencia
In: 
 Ever Banega – From Boca Juniors
 Hedwiges Maduro – From AFC Ajax

Out:
 Manuel Fernandes – On loan to Everton
 Jaime Gavilán – On loan to Getafe

Valladolid
In:
 Marcos Aguirre – From Lanús
 Vladimir Manchev – From Celta de Vigo

Out:
 Diego Figueredo – To Cerro Porteño

Villarreal
In:
 Marco Rubén – From River Plate
 Sebastián Eguren – From Hammarby IF
 Felipe Manoel – From São Bernardo Futebol Clube
Out:
 Rio Mavuba – On Loan to Lille
 Marco Rubén – On Loan to Recreativo de Huelva
 Felipe Manoel – On Loan to Sport Club do Recife

Zaragoza
In:
 Ewerthon – Loan return from VfB Stuttgart

Out:
 Ewerthon – On loan to RCD Espanyol
 Andrés D'Alessandro – On loan to San Lorenzo

Summer window

The 2007 summer window opened 1 July and closed 31 August.

Almería
In:
 Álvaro Negredo – From Real Madrid (€0.3m)
 Aitor López Rekarte – From Real Sociedad
 Felipe Melo – From Racing de Santander
 Natalio – From CD Castellón
 Corona – Return to Real Zaragoza
 Rubén Pulido – From Getafe CF
 Juanma Ortiz – From Atlético Madrid
 David Cobeño – On loan from Sevilla FC
 Mathias Vidangossy – On loan from Villarreal CF
 Julio dos Santos – On loan from Bayern Munich
 Diego Alves – From Atlético Mineiro

Out:
 Laurent de Palmas – To Elche CF
 Rodri – Return to Deportivo de La Coruña
 José Mena – Return to Deportivo Alavés
 Gorka Larrea – Return to Real Sociedad
 Mario Bermejo – On loan to Poli Ejido
 Francisco – To Granada 74 CF
 Pedro Mairata – To Gimnàstic de Tarragona
 Andrés Alberto – To AD Ceuta
 Sander Westerveld – To Sparta Rotterdam
 Joaquín Enrique Valerio – Released
 David Bermudo – Released (Signed for Pontevedra)

Athletic Bilbao
In:
 David López – From Osasuna
 Iñaki Muñoz – From Osasuna
 Aitor Ocio – From Sevilla
 Gorka Iraizoz – From Espanyol
 David Cuéllar – From Gimnàstic
 Koikili – From Sestao
 Asier Del Horno – On loan from Valencia

Out:
  Javier Iturriaga – To Salamanca
 Javi González – To Hércules
 Ismael Urzáiz – To Ajax
 Alex García – To Villarreal B
 Josu Sarriegi – To Panathinaikos
 Unai Alba – To Hércules
 Iñaki Lafuente – On loan to Espanyol
 Mikel Dañobeitia – Released (signed for Salamanca)

Atlético Madrid
In:
 Christian Abbiati – On loan from Milan
 Raúl García – From Osasuna (€13m)
 Cléber Santana – From Santos
 Luis García – From Liverpool (11 mln €)
  Diego Forlán – From Villarreal (21 mln €)
 Simão Sabrosa – From Benfica (20 mln € + 2 players)
 José Antonio Reyes – From Arsenal (12 mln €)
 Thiago Motta – From Barcelona (1 mln €)

Out:
  Federico Azcárate – To AEK Athens
  Luciano Galletti – To Olympiacos
 Gabi – To Zaragoza
 Fernando Torres – To Liverpool (30 million €)
 Francisco Molinero – To Mallorca
 Costinha – To Atalanta
 Martin Petrov – To Manchester City
 Roberto – On loan to Gimnàstic
 Iván Cuéllar – On loan to Eibar
 Toché – To Numancia
 Mario Suárez – On loan to Celta Vigo
 Diego Costa – On loan to Celta Vigo
 José Ignacio Zahinos – To Recreativo
 Peter Luccin – To Zaragoza

Barcelona
In:
 Thierry Henry – From Arsenal  (24 mln €)
 Yaya Touré – From AS Monaco (12 mln €)
 Bojan Krkić – Promoted from FC Barcelona B
  Giovani dos Santos – Promoted from FC Barcelona B
 Eric Abidal – From Lyon (14 mln €)
  Gabriel Milito – From Zaragoza (20.5 mln €)

Out:
  Javier Saviola – Released – (signed with Real Madrid)
  Giovanni van Bronckhorst – Released – (signed with Feyenoord)
 Ludovic Giuly – To Roma (3 mln €)
  Maxi López – To FC Moskva (2 mln €)
  Juliano Belletti – To Chelsea (5.5 mln €)
 Rubén – On loan to Ferrol
 Thiago Motta – To Atlético Madrid (1 mln €)
 Jesús Olmo – On loan to Ferrol

Betis
In:
 Mariano Pavone – From Estudiantes
 Leandro Somoza – On loan from Villarreal
 Willian Lima – From Atlético Mineiro
 Mark González – From Liverpool
 Marko Babić – From Leverkusen
 Ricardo – From Sporting
 Branko Ilič – From NK Domžale (permanent move)
 José Mari – From Villarreal

Out:
 Marcos Assunção – To Al-Ahli
 Robert – Return to PSV Eindhoven
 Jorge Wagner – To São Paulo
  Benjamín Zarandona – To Xerez
 Fabrice Pancrate – Return To Paris-SG
 Enrique Romero – Retired
 Johann Vogel – Left out of the squad (not registered)
 Alejandro Lembo – To Danubio
 Pedro Contreras – On loan to Cádiz
 Juanlu – On loan to Córdoba
 Oscar López – On loan to Gimnàstic
 Tati Maldonado – On loan to Gimnàstic
 Miguel Ángel – On loan to Levante
 Dani – On loan to Cádiz

Deportivo
In:
 Rodri – Return from Almería
 Rubén Castro – Return from Gimnàstic
 Momo – Return from Racing Santander
 Xisco – Return from Vecindario
 Ángel Lafita – On loan from Zaragoza
 Andrés Guardado – From Atlas (7 mln €)
 Aythami – From Las Palmas (0.6 mln €)

Out:
 Joan Capdevila – To Villarreal
 Javier Arizmendi – To Valencia
 Juanma – To Tenerife
 Jorge Andrade – To Juventus (10 mln €)
 Rodri – On loan to Poli Ejido
 Momo – On loan to Xerez CD

Manager in:
 Miguel Ángel Lotina – From Real Sociedad

Manager out:
 Joaquín Caparrós – Released – (took over Athletic Bilbao)

Espanyol
In:
 Clemente Rodríguez – From Boca Juniors (2,5 mln  €)
 Kiko Casilla – From Real Madrid Castilla
 Sergio Sánchez – Return from Real Madrid Castilla
 Valdo – From CA Osasuna
 José Luis Plata – From Málaga CF
 Milan Smiljanić – From FK Partizan

Out:
 Juan Velasco – Released
 Eduardo Costa – On loan to Grêmio
 Sergio Sánchez – On loan to Racing de Santander
 Walter Pandiani – To CA Osasuna

Getafe
In:
 Miguel Pallardó – On loan from Valencia CF
 Pablo Hernández – On loan from Valencia CF
 Ikechukwu Uche – From Recreativo de Huelva
 Mario – From Recreativo de Huelva
 Jajá – Return from K.R.C. Genk
 Daniel "Cata" Díaz – From Boca Juniors (6 mln €)
 Oscar Ustari – From Independiente
 Kepa – From Sevilla FC
 Esteban Granero – On loan from Real Madrid
 Rubén de la Red – From Real Madrid

Out:
 Alexis (footballer, born 1985) – To Valencia CF
 Javier Paredes – To Real Zaragoza
 Rubén Pulido – To UD Almería
 Maris Verpakovskis – Return to FC Dynamo Kiev
 Ángel Vivar Dorado – To Real Valladolid
 Daniel González Güiza – To Real Mallorca

Levante
In:
 David Castedo – From Sevilla
 Emilio Viqueira – From Recreativo
 Miquel Robusté – From Espanyol
 Javi Fuego – From Sporting Gijón
 Pedro León – From Real Murcia
 Juanma – Return from Recreativo
 Vladan Kujović – From Roda JC
  Alexandre Geijo – From Xerez
 Sávio – From Real Sociedad
 Bruno Cirillo – From AEK Athens
 Marco Storari – On loan from A.C. Milan Christian Riganò – From Messina Shota Arveladze – From AZ Alkmaar Miguel Ángel – On loan from Real BetisOut:
 Alexis (footballer, born 1974) – To Real Valladolid Diego Camacho – To  Real Valladolid José Francisco Molina – Released
 Salva – Return to Málaga Olivier Kapo – Return to Juventus Frederic Dehu – Released
 Sylvain N'Diaye – On loan to Tenerife Zé Maria – Released
 Gustavo Reggi – To CastellónMallorca
In:
 Germán Lux – From River Plate Borja Valero – From Real Madrid Castilla Francisco Molinero – From Atlético Madrid David Navarro – On loan from Valencia Pierre Webó – From Osasuna Gonzalo Castro – From Nacional Montevideo Daniel Güiza – From GetafeOut:
 Toni Prats – To Hércules Maxi López – Return to Barcelona Boško Janković – To PalermoMurcia
In:
 Enrique de Lucas – From Deportivo Alavés César Arzo – On loan from Villarreal CF Iñigo – From SD Eibar Henok Goitom – On loan from Udinese Calcio Pablo García – On loan from Real Madrid Mario Regueiro – On loan from Valencia CF Alvaro Mejía – From Real Madrid José María Movilla – From Real ZaragozaOut:

Osasuna
In:
 Xavier Margairaz – From FC Zürich Javier Portillo – From Gimnàstic de Tarragona Nicolás Medina – From Universidad de Chile Iñaki Astiz Ventura – Return from Legia Warsaw Hugo Viana – On loan from Valencia CF Carlos Vela – On loan from Arsenal F.C. Jaroslav Plasil – From AS Monaco Javi García – From Real Madrid (€2.5m)
 Walter Pandiani – From RCD EspanyolOut:
  Juanlu – Return to Real Betis  Valdo – To RCD Espanyol  David López – To Athletic Bilbao  Raúl García – To Atlético Madrid (€13m)
  Roberto Soldado – Return to Real Madrid  Carlos Cuéllar – To Rangers (3,5 mln €)
  Pierre Webó – To RCD Mallorca Nicolás Medina – On loan to SD EibarRacing
In:
 Jorge López – From Valencia CF Aldo Duscher – From Deportivo de La Coruña Euzebiusz Smolarek – From Borussia Dortmund Sergio Sánchez – On loan from RCD Espanyol Mohammed Tchité – From RSC Anderlecht Danny Szetela – From Columbus Crew Fabio Coltorti – From Grasshoppers Zürich César Navas – From Málaga CFOut:
 Momo – Return to Deportivo de La Coruña  Javier Balboa – Return to Real Madrid Pablo Alfaro – Retired
 Rubén – To Celta de Vigo Lionel Scaloni – To S.S. Lazio Nikola Žigić – To Valencia CF (€18 mill.)

Real Madrid

In: 	 
  Christopher Schorch – From Hertha Berlin (€0.6m)
  Christoph Metzelder – From Borussia Dortmund	
  Júlio Baptista – Return from Arsenal	
  Roberto Soldado – Return from Osasuna	
  Javier Balboa – Return from Racing Santander Pablo García – Return from Celta Vigo  Pepe – From F.C. Porto (30 mln €)
  Javier Saviola – From Barcelona Jerzy Dudek – From Liverpool Wesley Sneijder – From Ajax (27 mln €)
 Royston Drenthe – From Feyenoord (14 mln €)
 Gabriel Heinze – From Manchester United (12 mln €)
 Arjen Robben – From Chelsea (€31–35 Million)

Out: 	 
 David Beckham – To Los Angeles Galaxy Jonathan Woodgate – To Middlesbrough (10 mln €) (permanent move)	
 Roberto Carlos – To Fenerbahçe Carlos Diogo – To Real Zaragoza (6 mln €) (permanent move)
 Francisco Pavón – To Real Zaragoza Diego López – To Villarreal CF (6 mln €)
 Borja Valero – To Mallorca Pablo García – On loan to Real Murcia José Antonio Reyes – Return to Arsenal Raúl Bravo – To Olympiacos (2,3 mln €)
 Álvaro Mejía – To Real Murcia (undisclosed fee + an option to buy Dani Aquino)
 Iván Helguera – To Valencia Émerson – To A.C. Milan (5 mln €)
 Cicinho – To Roma (9 mln €)
 Antonio Cassano – On loan to Sampdoria Esteban Granero – On loan to Getafe Rubén de la Red – To Getafe Javi García – To Osasuna (€2.5m)

Manager in:
 Bernd Schuster – From GetafeManager out:
 Fabio Capello – Released

Recreativo
In:
 Carlos Martins – From Sporting CP Silvestre Varela – On loan from Sporting CP Javier Camuñas – From Xerez CD Beto – From FC Girondins de Bordeaux (permanent move)
 Quique Álvarez – From Villarreal CF Marcos García – On loan from Villarreal CF Martín Cáceres – On loan from Villarreal CF Javi Guerrero – From Celta Vigo (permanent move)
 Gerard López – From AS Monaco Mariano Barbosa – From Villarreal CF Edwin Congo – From Sporting de Gijón Ersen Martin – From TrabzonsporOut:
 César Arzo – Return to Villarreal CF Santi Cazorla – Return to Villarreal CF Juan Merino – Retired
 Ikechuwku Uche – To Getafe CF Mario – To Getafe CF Cheli – To Málaga CF Emilio Viqueira – To Levante UDSevilla
In:
 Jesuli – Return from Real Sociedad Kepa – Return from West Ham United F.C. Tom De Mul – From AFC Ajax Morgan De Sanctis – From Udinese Calcio Khalid Boulahrouz – On loan from Chelsea F.C. Ariza Makukula – Return from Gimnàstic de Tarragona Seydou Keita – From RC Lens Aquivaldo Mosquera – From C.F. Pachuca Arouna Koné – From PSV EindhovenOut:
 David Castedo – To Levante UD Kepa – To Getafe CF Aitor Ocio – To Athletic Bilbao Ariza Makukula – On loan to C.S. Marítimo Antonio Puerta – deceased

Valencia
In: 
 Alexis (footballer, born 1985) – From Getafe CF Javier Arizmendi – From Atlético Madrid Juan Manuel Mata – From Real Madrid Castilla Timo Hildebrand – From VfB Stuttgart  Stephen Sunday – From Poli Ejido Marco Caneira – Return from Sporting CP Iván Helguera – From Real Madrid Nikola Žigić – From Racing SantanderOut:
 Roberto Ayala – To Real Zaragoza Miguel Pallardó – On loan to Getafe CF Pablo Hernández – On loan to Getafe CF David Navarro – On loan to RCD Mallorca Hugo Viana – On loan to CA Osasuna Ludovic Butelle – On loan to Real Valladolid Mario Regueiro – On loan to Real Murcia Asier Del Horno – On loan to Athletic BilbaoValladolid
In:
 Jonathan Sesma – From Cádiz Alexis (footballer, born 1974) – From Levante Diego Camacho – From Levante Ángel Vivar Dorado – From Getafe Ludovic Butelle – On loan from ValenciaOut:

Villarreal
In:
 Mathias Vidangossy – From Unión Española Giuseppe Rossi – From Manchester United Joan Capdevila – From Deportivo de La Coruña Diego López Rodríguez – From Real Madrid Tomané Nunes – From Sporting CP Martín Cáceres – From Defensor Sporting Club Diego Godín – From Nacional Montevideo Stefan Babović – From OFK Beograd Feliciano Condesso – From Southampton F.C. Juan Román Riquelme – Return from Boca Juniors Santi Cazorla – Return from Recreativo de Huelva Rio Mavuba – From FC Girondins de Bordeaux (8 mln €)
 Ángel – From Celta VigoOut:
 Rodolfo Arruabarrena – To AEK Athens F.C. Alessio Tacchinardi – Return to Juventus F.C. César Arzo – On loan to Real Murcia Diego Forlán – To Atlético Madrid Luis Valencia – On loan to Wigan Athletic Quique Álvarez – To Recreativo de Huelva Marcos García – On loan to Recreativo de Huelva José Mari – To Real Betis Mariano Barbosa – To Recreativo de Huelva Juan Manuel Peña – To Celta de Vigo Mathias Vidangossy – On loan to UD AlmeríaZaragoza
In:
 Gabi – From Atlético Madrid Francelino Matuzalem – From Shaktar Donetsk Javier Paredes – From Getafe CF Corona – Return from UD Almería David Generelo – Return from Gimnàstic de Tarragona Ricardo Oliveira – On loan from A.C. Milan Roberto Ayala – From Villarreal CF Francisco Pavón – From Real Madrid Peter Luccin – From Atlético MadridOut:
  Gerard Piqué – Return to Manchester United Ángel Lafita – On loan to Deportivo de La Coruña Agustín Aranzábal – Retired
 César – Retired
 José María Movilla – To Real Murcia''

References

2007-08
Trans
Spain
Spain